Michael Patrick Thomas Lynagh, AM (born 25 October 1963) is an Australian former rugby union player who played mainly as a fly-half.
Lynagh represented Australia from 1984 to 1995, playing at both inside centre and fly half. Lynagh was capped 72 times for Australia, and was captain from 1993 to 1995. He was the world points scoring record holder when he retired, with 911 points.

Lynagh was a member of the 1984 Grand Slam-winning team and was vice-captain when Australia won the 1991 World Cup. Until Marty Roebuck took over the kicking duties, he scored in every test he played in, including a try against Wales in 1984 when he was temporarily relieved of kicking responsibilities.

He retired from international rugby after Australia's loss to England in the quarter-final of the 1995 Rugby World Cup.

Early years
Lynagh attended St. Joseph's College, Gregory Terrace in Brisbane and played fly-half in the school's first XV from Year 10 to Year 12 (1979–1981). Terrace won the GPS premiership five years straight from 1977 to 1981 with Lynagh playing in the final 3 years and was captain in his last year. Lynagh also played First XI Cricket from Year 9 to Year 12 and was captain in his final year.
During his studies at Queensland University, Lynagh worked as a boarding master at Nudgee College Brisbane together with another union great Michael O'Connor who at that time made the decision to opt for the League game.

Personal
Lynagh's son Louis is also a professional rugby player, having signed with Harlequins in 2019 and made his premiership debut in October 2020. In November 2020, Lynagh's youngest son Tom signed with his home club Queensland from 2021 to 2023.

Career
After school he played first grade for University of Queensland and represented Queensland from 1982 to 1995. Lynagh was a member of Queensland's Super 6 and Super 10-winning sides.

On 9 June 1984, at the age of 20, Lynagh made his debut for Australia against Fiji in Suva. Early in his career he played at inside centre as Mark Ella was the fly-half; when Ella retired after the 1984 Grand Slam, Lynagh took over as fly-half.

In 1991, he joined Italian club Benetton Treviso. He played for five years with the club and won the Italian championship at 1991–92 season.

In 1996, Lynagh joined Saracens of England at the advent of professionalism, after retiring from a glittering 12-year international career with Australia as the world record points scorer with 911 and a World Cup winner (1991).

Lynagh's arrival at the club was the first major signing after Nigel Wray took control of the club and he acted as a beacon to attract other players and fans alike. Lynagh helped Saracens to have their most successful season to date.

In the 1997/98 season Saracens battled it out with Newcastle Falcons for almost the whole season for top spot in the league and when the two sides met in front of a crowd of nearly 20,000 Lynagh slotted a match winning drop goal in the dying minutes to send Vicarage Road into raptures. A month later he was on hand to steer Saracens to their famous Tetley's Bitter Cup 48–18 victory over Wasps at Twickenham, bringing the curtain down on a season to remember.

Retirement
Lynagh is now managing director, Dow Jones Corporate EMEA. 
He is also a TV rugby analyst for Sky Sports UK. 
On 18 April 2012 Lynagh was admitted to the Royal Brisbane Hospital after experiencing sudden onset of headache, dizziness and visual disturbance after a coughing fit. There it was diagnosed that he had suffered a life-threatening stroke due to vertebral artery dissection. Lynagh was released from hospital on 2 May 2012, having largely recovered apart from a left hemianopsia (loss of the left half of the vision in both eyes).

Lynagh was made a Member of the Order of Australia in 1996, inducted into the Sport Australia Hall of Fame in 1999, and received an Australian Sports Medal in 2000. He was inducted into the International Rugby Hall of Fame in 2001 and the Wallaby Hall of Fame in 2013.

Accolades

Bob Dwyer, former Australian rugby coach, in his first autobiography The Winning Way, claimed Michael Lynagh to be one of the five most accomplished Australian rugby union players he had ever seen. Dwyer ranked Lynagh number one "for his range of point-scoring skills..."

In 2007 Will Carling, former captain of England, listed Lynagh as one of the 50 greatest rugby union players of all-time. Carling ranked Lynagh at number 41 writing that he was a "Great tactician, great kicker, very underrated runner, [and] pivot of 1991 World Cup-winning side."

In 2003, News Limited Newspapers the Daily Telegraph in Sydney and the Courier-Mail in Brisbane ranked the top 100 Australian rugby players of all-time. Michael Lynagh was ranked among the top 10 greatest Australian rugby union players of all-time.

References

External links

Sporting Heroes profile
Talk Rugby Union profile

1963 births
Living people
Australian rugby union players
Australia international rugby union players
Australian expatriate sportspeople in England
Australian rugby union captains
Barbarian F.C. players
Australian people of Irish descent
Rugby union fly-halves
Saracens F.C. players
Members of the Order of Australia
Recipients of the Australian Sports Medal
World Rugby Hall of Fame inductees
Sport Australia Hall of Fame inductees
Rugby union players from Brisbane